Limadorex is a genus of land snails with an operculum, terrestrial gastropod mollusks in the family Pomatiidae.

Species 
Species within the genus Limadorex include:
Limadorex limonensis (Torre & Bartsch, 1941)

References 

Pomatiidae